The Sanders classification is a system of categorizing intra-articular calcaneal fractures based on the number of articular fragments seen on the coronal CT image at the widest point of the posterior facet.

Classification

See also 
Foot fracture

References
Orthobullets

Orthopedic classifications
Injuries of ankle and foot